is a Japanese freestyle skier. He competed in the men's aerials event at the 2006 Winter Olympics.

References

1978 births
Living people
Japanese male freestyle skiers
Olympic freestyle skiers of Japan
Freestyle skiers at the 2006 Winter Olympics
Sportspeople from Toyama Prefecture
Freestyle skiers at the 2007 Asian Winter Games
21st-century Japanese people